Somewhere in the Sun... Best of the Dream Academy is a compilation album released by The Dream Academy in Japan in 2000. The compilation album contains the extended version of "Life in a Northern Town" and an acoustic version of "The Party" rather than the more common versions. At the time of its release, Nick Laird-Clowes revealed that the band actually had no involvement with the album, and he went on further to say that they weren't even informed by Warners that a compilation album was being made. His former label boss, Alan McGee, then of Creation Records, was the one who actually brought him home a copy when he was visiting Japan on business. According to Kate St John, around the same time that this album was being made, Warner Brothers were considering a US compilation album, but they and the band decided to re-issue their first album, The Dream Academy.

Track listing
"Life in a Northern Town" (Extended Version)   – 5:20
"Ballad in 4/4"   – 3:59
"Power to Believe"   – 5:15
"Lucy September"   – 3:08
"Twelve-Eight Angel"   – 4:20
"One Dream"   – 2:33
"Hampstead Girl"   – 3:41
"This World"   – 5:07
"The Love Parade"   – 3:46
"It'll Never Happen Again"   – 3:32
"Love" (Hare Krishna Mix)   – 7:02
"Indian Summer"   – 4:55
"In Places on the Run"   – 4:28
"(Johnny) New Light"   – 4:23
"The Party" (Acoustic Version)   – 3:32
"Please Please Please Let Me Get What I Want"   – 3:07
"Waterloo"   – 5:03
"Lowlands"   – 3:46

References

2000 compilation albums
Warner Records compilation albums
The Dream Academy albums